Albert Bruce-Joy (21 August 1842 – 22 July 1924) was an Irish sculptor working in England. His original surname was Joy but he became known under his hyphenated name Bruce-Joy later in life. 
He was the brother of the painter George W. Joy.

Biography
Son of William Bruce Joy, MD, Bruce-Joy was born in Dublin but educated in Offenbach, Paris and at King's College London.

He trained as a sculptor with John Henry Foley at the National Art Training School, South Kensington, and the Royal Academy Schools. He began exhibiting at the Royal Academy from 1866 onwards. In 1867 he gave an address in Rome where he is said to have spent three years.

After his return to London, he took over the commission for a statue of Robert James Graves for the Royal College of Physicians in Dublin. This was originally given to the late John Foley (died 1874) who had previously finished three statues for the College. This marked the start of his specialisation in portrait statues, busts and medallions which were praised at the time for their likeness, and for which he is now mostly known.

Bruce-Joy built his house in Shottermill near Haslemere in 1891, and travelled to America twice in his life.

Works
(a detailed list is given at the University of Glasgow's database)
 Statue of John Laird (1877) in Birkenhead.
 Statue of William Harvey (1878), Surgeon, The Leas, Folkestone, Kent.
 Statue of James Whiteside (1880) in St Patrick's Cathedral, Dublin.
 Monument known as the Ayer Lion (1880) sculpted from Italian marble for the grave site of James Cook Ayer in Lowell Cemetery, Lowell, Massachusetts.
 Statue of Gladstone (1882) in front of Bow Church, Bow, London.
 Statues of John Bright (1891), and Oliver Heywood (1894) in Albert Square, Manchester.
 Statue of Alexander Balfour (1905) in St John's Gardens, Liverpool.

Gallery

References

Further reading
Gerhard Bissell, Joy, Albert Bruce, in: Allgemeines Künstlerlexikon, vol. 78, 2013.

1842 births
1924 deaths
Alumni of King's College London
20th-century British sculptors
19th-century British sculptors
British male sculptors
Artists from Dublin (city)
19th-century British male artists
20th-century British male artists